Phil Ranstrom is an American documentary film maker.

Career
From 1994 to 2006 Ranstrom worked as the producer of the documentary Cheat You Fair: The Story of Maxwell Street.  During that time he interviewed a variety of  blues musicians such as Buddy Guy, Bo Diddley and Johnny Williams. Ranstrom tells the story of the displacement of the neighborhood's residents in favor of condos and commercial establishments and the subsequent effect on blues culture.  The film won a nomination at the 2012 Chicago / Midwest Emmy Awards for Outstanding Crafts Achievement Off-Air: Writer – Program On (non news) category.

References

External links 
 

Living people
American documentary film directors
Year of birth missing (living people)